The  was one of the most powerful aristocratic kin groups (uji) of the Asuka period of the early Japanese state—the Yamato polity—and played a major role in the spread of Buddhism. Through the 5th and 7th centuries, the Soga monopolized the kabane or hereditary rank of Great Omi and was the first of many families to dominate the Imperial House of Japan by influencing the order of succession and government policy.

The last Soga predates any historical work in Japan, and very little is known about its earliest members.

Origins
The Soga clan is believed to have been founded by Soga no Ishikawa, a great-grandson of Emperor Kōgen.

Notation
Today, the name Soga, when referring to the Soga clan, is written in kanji as 蘇我. This notation derives from the Nihon Shoki, where 蘇我 is the principal way in which this name is written. Other ways of writing the clan name appeared in other historical documents. The two characters used in this name are ateji; the meanings of the characters (蘇: "resuscitation"; 我: "self") are unrelated to the name meaning.

Soga no Iname
Soga no Iname served as Great Minister from 536 until his death in 570, and was the first of the Soga clan to carry to extreme lengths the domination of the Throne by the nobility. One of the chief ways he exerted influence was through marital connections with the imperial family; Iname married two of his daughters to Emperor Kinmei, one giving offspring to an Emperor, Emperor Yōmei. The next five emperors all had a wife or mother who was a descendant of Iname. In this way the Soga unified and strengthened the country by expanding the power of the Emperor as a symbol and spiritual leader as they took control of secular matters.

Connection to Buddhism from Korea and China
The Soga clan had much contact with foreigners, including the Koreans and the Chinese. They favored the adoption of Buddhism and of governmental and cultural models based on Chinese Confucianism. 

The Soga clan supported the spread of Buddhism when it was first introduced in Japan during the 6th century by monks from Baekje (Japanese Kudara). Many Japanese at the time, disliking foreign ideas and believing that this new religion might be an affront to the traditional "kami" or spirits and gods, opposed Buddhism. The rival Mononobe and Nakatomi clans succeeded in gathering hostility against this new religion when a disease spread, following the arrival of a Buddhist statue. It was claimed the epidemic was a sign of anger by the local spirits and the Soga temple at the palace was burned down.

The Soga family, however, firmly believed that the most civilized people believed in Buddhism and continued to actively promote it, placing a holy image of the Buddha in a major Shinto shrine. Soga no Iname claimed that Buddhism brought with it a new form of government that would subvert the independence of the clans, unifying the people under the Emperor. After fifty years of ideological war, Buddhism, defended and protected by the Soga, began to take hold in Japan.

Political assertiveness and reactions
By 644, the heads of the Soga were no longer satisfied to act behind the scenes. Soga no Emishi and his son Soga no Iruka began to build increasingly elaborate palaces and tombs for themselves, styling themselves "sovereigns".

In response, the leader of the Nakatomi clan, Nakatomi no Kamatari (later known as the founder of the Fujiwara and traditionally referred to as Fujiwara no Kamatari), conspired with Soga no Kurayamada no Ishikawa no Maro and Prince Naka no Ōe (later Emperor Tenji) and arranged for Iruka's assassination. Prince Ōe himself attacked Iruka during a court ceremony concerning edicts from Korean kingdoms in front of Empress Kōgyoku; he survived, but the Empress left the scene and Ōe's guards finished Iruka off. Subsequently, Soga no Emishi committed suicide by burning down his own residence, destroying many important court documents. Soga followers were dispersed and even killed; the Empress abdicated and her brother took the throne as Emperor Kōtoku. The Soga clan's hold over the imperial family was broken and two years later the Emperor enacted the Taika Reform, returning full power to the emperor. This disruptive and transformative event is known as the Isshi Incident.

Legacy
In 2005, the remains of a building which may have been Soga no Iruka's residence were discovered in Nara.  This discovery appeared to be consistent with the description found in Nihon Shoki.

Family
Takenouchi no Sukune (武内宿禰, ?–?)
Soga no Ishikawa (蘇我石川, ?–?)
Soga no Machi (蘇我満智, ?–?)
Soga no Karako (蘇我韓子, ?–465)
Soga no Koma (蘇我高麗, ?–?)
Soga no Iname (蘇我稲目, c.506–570)
Soga no Umako (蘇我馬子, 551?–626)
Soga no Emishi (蘇我蝦夷, 587–645)
Soga no Iruka (蘇我入鹿, 610?–645)
Soga no Zentoko (蘇我善徳, ?–?)
Soga no Kuramaro (蘇我倉麻呂, ?–?)
Soga no Kurayamada no Ishikawamaro (蘇我倉山田石川麻呂, ?–649)
Soga no Akae (蘇我赤兄, 623?–?)
Soga no Murajiko (蘇我連子, 611?–664)
Soga no Yasumaro (蘇我安麻呂, ?–?)
Soga no Himuka (蘇我日向, ?–?)
Soga no Hatayasu (蘇我果安, ?–672)

References

Sansom, George (1958). A History of Japan to 1334''' Stanford, California: Stanford University Press.
Hall, John Whitney, et al. (1993). The Cambridge History of Japan: Volume 1 Ancient Japan''. Cambridge University Press. .

 
Japanese clans
Buddhism in the Asuka period